Nikolay Victorovich Baskov (born 15 October 1976) is a Russian tenor who performs in both operatic and popular music styles. His honors include commendations as Meritorious Artist and People's Artist of the Russian Federation, as well as People's Artist of Ukraine.

In addition to his career as a vocalist, Baskov is a regular figure on the Russian game show What? Where? When?.

Biography
Baskov studied at the Gnessin Russian Academy of Music and Moscow Conservatory. In 1998, he placed first in the All-Russian Young Singers Competition and placed second in the 1999 Grande Voce competition in Spain.

Released in 2011, the Nikolai Baskov: Romantic Journey concert performance CD/DVD took place at Moscow's Hall of the Luzhniki Stadium. Baskov was accompanied by a full orchestra and played to a crowd of nearly 10,000 people. Taped with 24 HD cameras, this is Russia's most elaborate and expensive performance ever recorded for international television. He performed classic pieces from Tosca, La bohème, Werther, Turandot and other popular songs from his catalogue such as Be My Love, Granada and Back to Sorrento. Baskov is joined by world-renowned soprano, Montserrat Caballé, and her daughter Marti, for several duets.

In early 2012, Baskov embarked on his first American tour.

In December 2012, he signed an open letter against a St. Petersburg bill banning "homosexual propaganda," along with pop stars like Philipp Kirkorov and Dima Bilan.

In March 2022, Baskov openly supported Russia's military aggression and invasion in Ukraine. On 7 March, the Prosecutor General of Ukraine informed Baskov of suspicion of propagandizing war on the territory of Ukraine. The court arrested him in absentia. He claimed "thirty years of unprincipled deception of Russia by the West", accused the United States of trying to "destroy Russia" and said that “claims that NATO is peaceful are a lie”. After these statements, the Latvian Ministry of Foreign Affairs announced on 24 March that Baskov would be banned from entering Latvia indefinitely.

Discography
 Dedication  (Посвящение, 2000)
 Dedication Encore (Посвящение на бис, 2000)
 Masterpieces of the Passing Century (Шедевры уходящего века, 2001)
 I'm 25 (Мне 25, 2001)
 Never say Goodbye (Никогда не говори прощай, 2004)
 Let me go (ОтпуЖсти меня, 2005)
 Best Songs (Лучшие песни, 2005)
 Only for you (Тебе одной, 2007)
 Romantic Journey, 2011
 Game (Игра, 2016)

Extended plays 

 Karaoke EP (2020)

Pesnya goda

Honours and awards

 Medal of the Order "For Merit to the Fatherland," 2nd class (9 December 2006) - for achievements in the field of culture and art, and many years of fruitful work
 Honoured Artist of the Russian Federation (6 September 2001) - for services to the arts
 People's Artist of Ukraine (November 2004)

Sanctions 
In February 2023 Canada sanctioned Nikolay Baskov for being involved in Russian propaganda and spreading misinformation relating to the 2022 war in Ukraine.

See also
Operatic pop

References

External links
 http://www.baskov.ru/ – official site
 http://nvbaskov.ucoz.com/ 
 Nikolay Baskov at the Forbes
 
 Concert of Nikolay Baskov in Vitebsk, Belarus
Concert of Nikolay Baskov in Olympic Stadium, Moscow 

1976 births
Living people
Singers from Moscow
People's Artists of Russia
Recipients of the Medal of the Order "For Merit to the Fatherland" II class
Recipients of the Order of Francysk Skaryna
Recipients of the title of People's Artists of Ukraine
Russian operatic tenors
Russian pop singers
21st-century Russian male singers
21st-century Russian singers
Winners of the Golden Gramophone Award